Semantic AI (formerly Semantic Research, Inc.) is a privately held software company headquartered in San Diego, California with offices in the National Capitol Region.  Semantic AI is a Delaware C-corporation that offers patented, graph-based knowledge discovery, analysis and visualization software technology. Its original product is a link analysis software application called Semantica Pro, and it has recently introduced a web-based analytical environment called the Cortex Enterprise Intelligence Platform, or Cortex EIP.

History 
The SEMANTICA platform was originally conceived as a method to help biology students learn and retain knowledge about complex organic structures. Joe Faletti, Kathleen Fisher, and several colleagues in the University of California system created SemNet, a computer program used to draw a network of "concepts" connected to each other by "relations". In the late 1960s, Ross Quillian and Allan Collins used the concept of semantic networks as a way of talking about the organization of human semantic memory, or memory for inter-related word concepts. Using SemNet, students could employ simple components to build complex networks.
 
After the 9/11 al-Qaeda terrorist attacks on the World Trade Center in 2001, the U.S. Intelligence Community realized analysts desperately needed a way to "connect the dots"; they needed a platform to fuse data stored in separate silos and interrogate it in real time to answer intelligence questions. Recognizing the potential for SemNet to do that, Joe Faletti teamed up with Charles Gillespie, Chip Harrison and Chris Staszak to found Semantic Research, Inc. (SRI) in October 2001. The team of engineers and intelligence analysts at SRI expanded the SemNet program into SEMANTICA Pro, a network analysis program.

Semantic Research achieved early adoption by U.S. Government customers including the intelligence community. SEMANTICA Pro was featured in CIOReview magazine among the "20 most promising defense technology solution providers" of 2015. SEMANTICA Pro has evolved into a desktop software application used to tackle difficult analytical challenges across a wide spectrum of industries and missions, including casinos and gaming, law enforcement, intelligence, financial services, advisory and consulting services, anti-money laundering compliance, and counter-terrorism operations. Since 2016, Semantic Research has expanded its commercial footprint. Today, several Fortune 500 companies are using SEMANTICA to combat fraud, comply with anti-money laundering regulations, conduct corporate due diligence investigations, and to identify and analyze security threats.

See also
 Concept mapping
 Information visualization
 Intelligence analysis
 Knowledge representation
 Semantic network

References

Software companies based in California
Companies based in San Diego
Companies established in 2001
Business software companies
Big data companies
Software companies of the United States